Osayaba Andrew Ize-Iyamu, better known by his stage name Cruel Santino, is a Nigerian alternative singer-songwriter, rapper, creative director, filmmaker, and music video director. He is a member of Monster Boys collective, with music producers Genio Bambino, and GMK. He is signed to Interscope Records, in partnership with Monster Boy, Love Renaissance and Warner Chappell Music. Santino's debut into the music scene was met with critical acclaim when he released his studio album Mandy & The Jungle, introducing the alté fashion, and music, into the mainstream, notably with his track "Rapid Fire",.

Early life
Osayaba Andrew Ize-Iyamu was born on 3 June 1992, in Lagos, and raised in Ikeja to Nigerian parents. Before he graduated from high school, he was a teenage drama coordinator in high school. After graduation, he participated in city-wide attention as a freestyle-rap prodigy. In an interview with British GQ, he said "I heard Drake’s first album, Thank Me Later. Hearing someone sing and rap confirmed to me that I could do the same." His father was responsible for his music education, while growing-up.

Career

2011-2016:Ozzy B to Santi, Suzie's Funeral, Gangsta Fear
In 2011, he launched his music career as a rapper on SoundCloud, with the stage name Ozzy B. On 13 September 2011, he released a 21-track mixtape titled Diaries of a Loner, independently on SoundCloud. In review for We Plug Good Music, Neefemi, said "the project is one of Nigeria’s best mixtapes with time". On 29 September 2013, he released his second mixtape Birth of Santi. In 2016, he changed his stage name to Santi, with the release of his first extended play Suzie's Funeral, through Monster Boy on 30 June 2016.

On 29 June 2016, "Gangsta Fear" a song of his own composition, co-written by Odunsi (The Engine), breakout from SoundCloud, with elements of afro-dancehall. Following the release of the music video directed by Falomo and Santi himself. The record became a commercial success in the alternative music scene, in Nigeria, and Britain.

2017-2018:OVO Sounds, Beat 1, Concerts, Rapid Fire

In 2017, he opened for Skepta’s at Our Homecoming concert in Nigeria. On 1 April 2017, " Jungle Fever", and "Gangsta Fear" was aired on OVO Sound’s Episode 40. On 22 December 2017, he opened for Burna Boy, Skepta, and J Hus at the second edition of Nativeland concert. On 29 December 2017, he opened for Show Dem Camp at The Palmwine Music Fest, alongside Bez, Ajebutter22, Lady Donli, Odunsi, Tomi Thomas, among others. On 21 January 2018, Santino, Odunsi, MAKA, and Lady Donli, covers the Guardian Life Magazine, Vibes Of The New Age edition, where they spoke about their plans for the future.

On 2 November 2018, as Santi, he released "Rapid Fire", featuring Shane Eagle, Tomi Agape, and Amaarae through Monster Boy, and produced by Genio Bambino. On 23 November 2018, the music video for "Rapid Fire" was released, and self-directed by Santino, as Santi. After his interview with Julie Adenuga, and Ebro Darden, on Apple Music 1, he gained international awareness.

In 2018, he signed a partnership deal with the North Carolina-based imprint Immaculate Taste, and rereleased Suzie's Funeral.

2019-2020:Mandy & The Jungle, Record deals, No Tears In The Jungle show
On 17 May 2019, as Santi's, Santino released his first debut studio album Mandy & The Jungle, with guess appearance from DRAM, GoldLink, Tay Iwar, Amaarae, Krisirie, Nonso Amadi, Bridge, Shane Eagle, Kida Kudz, Seki, and Tomi Agape. With production credits from Odunsi(The Engine), GMK, Higo, LeMav, DOZ, and Genio Bambino. Mandy & The Jungle, was cited as one of the Guardian albums and tracks of 2019.

Same day, shortly after the release of Mandy & The Jungle, on 20 May 2019, Tunde Balogun, the co-founder of Love Renaissance. Tweeted " Welcome Santi to the @LVRN fam". On 28 August 2019, Santino, credited as Santi, directed "U Say" music video by GoldLink, featuring Tyler, The Creator, and Jay Prince, off Diaspora studio album. On 6 February 2020, Santi on the lineup of Lovebox Festival, set to take place at Gunnersbury Park in London, from June 12–14. Following the outbreak of the ongoing spread of coronavirus, the festival was cancelled. On 3 November 2019, he performed at Day n Vegas Festival at Las Vegas Festival Grounds, and opened for Tyler, The Creator, and Doja Cat.

On 10 November 2020, he performed at the Gnaw Stage, of the Camp Flog Gnaw Carnival. On 5 December 2019, he headline his first show in London, titled No Tears In The Jungle, at Islington Assembly Hall. On 3 March 2020, Santi reveals his plan, to create a TV show about Nigerian youth culture. He tells Crack Magazine, "That’s where my heart is right now. In Nigeria, we have never had a show about high school, sexuality and drugs. I feel like the kids need a safe space, something to explore and escape to."

On 19 May 2020, he tweeted "U Guy's I had to change my name to Cruel Santino, cause of one man in Spain, he didn't want to free the name for me. On 30 May 2020, he starred in The Late Night Show with Daisy Ola, where he played numerous characters as Hamma Santino, Santino Criminal, Santino and the leader, Cruel Santino.

On 19 June 2020, Cruel Santino unveiled the joint venture deal with Interscope Records, and Monster Boy, with the release of "End of The Wicked", featuring Octavian.

2021-present:Publishing deal, Subaru Boys : FINAL HEAVEN
On 17 February 2021, following the publishing partnership between Warner Chappell Music, and Love Renaissance, Monster Boys collective (Cruel Santino, GMK, and Genio Bambino) signed a publishing deal with Warner Chappell Music. On 4 March 2022, he released his anticipated studio album Subaru Boys : FINAL HEAVEN, through Interscope Records, with guest appearances from Brazy, Maison2500, Bratzbih, Seo, Ebee, Koffee, Gus Dapperton, Amaarae, Chi Virgo, Solis, and Skepta. Rolling Stone included the album in their list of The 100 Best Albums of 2022. On 10 February 2023, Santino released "Showmetheway!!" featuring Poco Lee, and produced by GMK for Monster Boy.

Artistry
Santino is known for blending and fusing a variety of sounds, from R&B, soul and rap to Afrobeats and indie music,. On 11 June 2019, Toye Sokunbi of The Fader, named him, as the vision of Afropop’s future. Cruel Santino, formerly known as Ozzy B or Santi, is known for his ragga-influenced delivery, hair style and fashion sense. On 31 May 2019, in an interview with Clash magazine, Osayaba Andrew Ize-Iyamu describing himself as "being involved in all genres, definitely a unique individual. Taking inspiration for his name from Santigold. Inspired by the likes of Beenie Man, and Young Thug, as well as being shaped by indie and hip-hop music, has helped him evolve as an artist."

In 2011, he was rated as one of the best rappers in Nigeria, by Nigerian Afro-pop singer Wizkid. also appearing in a Nokia advert with, Nigerian rappers Muna, and Phenom.

Discography

Albums

EPs

Mixtapes

Singles

As featured artist

Awards and nominations

References

Living people
Nigerian rappers
Residents of Lagos
Nigerian hip hop musicians
Nigerian alté singers
1992 births